Ornaisons XIII were a French Rugby league club based in Ornaisons, Aude in the Languedoc-Roussillon region. The club played in the lower leagues of French rugby league and were the reserve team of Elite One Championship club Lézignan Sangliers.

See also

National Division 2

French rugby league teams
Defunct rugby league teams in France